Wadala Assembly constituency is one of the ten constituencies of the Maharashtra Legislative Assembly located in the Mumbai City district.

It is a part of the Mumbai South Central (Lok Sabha constituency) along with five other assembly constituencies, viz Dharavi, Sion Koliwada, Mahim, from Mumbai City district and Chembur and Anushakti Nagar from Mumbai Suburban district.

Members of Legislative Assembly

Election results

2019 result

2014 result

2009 result

See also
List of constituencies of Maharashtra Legislative Assembly

References

Assembly constituencies of Mumbai
Mumbai City district
Assembly constituencies of Maharashtra